The 2011 Medibank International Sydney was a tennis tournament played on outdoor hard courts. It was the 119th edition of the Medibank International Sydney, and part of the ATP World Tour 250 series of the 2011 ATP World Tour, and of the WTA Premier tournaments of the 2011 WTA Tour. Both the men's and the women's events took place at the NSW Tennis Centre in Sydney, Australia, from 9 to 15 January 2011.

WTA entrants

Seeds

* As of 3 January 2011

Other entrants
The following players received wildcards into the singles main draw:
  Jelena Dokić
  Anastasia Rodionova

The following players received entry into the singles main draw through qualifying:

  Lucie Hradecká
  Bojana Jovanovski
  Ekaterina Makarova
  Virginie Razzano
  Sandra Záhlavová
  Barbora Záhlavová-Strýcová

The following player received entry into the singles main draw via a lucky loser spot:
  Sybille Bammer

ATP entrants

Seeds

* Rankings are as of 3 January 2011.

Other entrants
The following players received wildcards into the singles main draw:
  Juan Martín del Potro
  Matthew Ebden
  James Ward

The following players received entry into the singles main draw through qualifying:

  Igor Andreev
  Frederico Gil
  Chris Guccione
  Bernard Tomic

Finals

Men's singles

 Gilles Simon defeated  Viktor Troicki, 7–5, 7–6(7–4)
It was Simon's first title of the year and 8th of his career.

Women's singles

 Li Na defeated  Kim Clijsters, 7–6(7–3), 6–3
 It was Li's 1st title of the year and 4th of her career.

Men's doubles

 Lukáš Dlouhý /  Paul Hanley defeated  Bob Bryan /  Mike Bryan, 6–7(6–8), 6–3, [10–5]

Women's doubles

 Iveta Benešová /  Barbora Záhlavová-Strýcová defeated  Květa Peschke /  Katarina Srebotnik, 4–6, 6–4, [10–7].

References

External links
Official website

 
Medibank International Sydney, 2011

cs:Medibank International Sydney 2011 - muži
fr:Tournoi de Sydney 2011 (ATP)
pl:Medibank International Sydney 2011 - mężczyźni